is a Japanese actress who was previously signed to Stardust Promotion. Her former stage name was Hana Kajiura.

Biography
Sugisaki debuted as a child actress with Stardust Promotion under the stage name . She withdrew from the industry for a period of time, but subsequently decided that she wanted to become an actress. She chose it to sign with the Ken-On group, because Mirai Shida, whom Hana is a fan of, belongs to the talent agency. She re-debuted with Ken-On in April 2011.

Filmography

Film

Television drama

Other television

Radio

Awards

References

External links 
  
 
 

1997 births
Living people
Asadora lead actors
Japanese child actresses
Japanese film actresses
Japanese radio personalities
Japanese television actresses
Japanese voice actresses
Ken-On artists
Voice actresses from Tokyo
21st-century Japanese actresses